France's national rugby union team first played Argentina in 1949 when they undertook a two-test tour of the latter country. France won both matches. Argentina did not manage a win over France until their 16th meeting in 1985, under the captaincy of Hugo Porta.

France has been Argentina's most frequent Test match opponent. France played a significant role in the early development of Argentine rugby in which the two countries played each other 13 times between 1949 and 1977. In total, the two countries have met 51 times, with France winning 36 games, Argentina 14 and one game is drawn. 

The teams have played each other three times at Rugby World Cup tournaments: In 1999 France won a quarter-final, and in 2007 Argentina beat France 17–12 in the tournament-opening pool game and again 34–10 in the playoff for third and fourth place after Argentina had lost to tournament winners South Africa in the semi-final. Even though Argentina had shown strong form in the year leading up to the tournament (winning 10 of 13 Test matches plus a one-point loss to France), the opening-game win was regarded as an upset by the media.

Though about two-thirds of the games have been played on Argentina's ground, France has won more than two-thirds of them. France won the only match the two have played on neutral ground.

The biggest difference in points was achieved by France during the second game of their 2012 tour to Argentina, winning 49–10.

Since 2000, the series has been especially closely fought, though Argentina has had the upper hand. In the 19 matches played in that time frame, the Pumas are 10–9, but nine of the matches were decided by a converted try (7 points) or less.

When the IRB introduced their world team rankings system in 2003, Argentina was ranked seventh and France fifth. Since then the ranking changed frequently and the two teams' order was reversed many times like in March 2009, when Argentina climbed to fourth place and France fell to seventh. Most recently, following Argentina's win in the first of their two-Test series in June 2012, the two teams switched places in the rankings with the Pumas in sixth and France in seventh but after their second game a week later, which saw France won by 39 points, France climbed back to the 5th place and Argentina drop to eighth.

Summary

Overview

Records
Note: Date shown in brackets indicates when the record was or last set.

Results

List of series

Notes

References

 All match results from Pick and Go Rugby Test match database

France national rugby union team matches
Argentina national rugby union team matches